The 2022 Ealing London Borough Council election took place on 5 May 2022, under new election boundaries, which increased the number of Ealing London Borough Council councillors to 70. The elections took place alongside local elections in the other London boroughs and elections to local authorities across the United Kingdom.

The Labour Party maintained its control of the council, winning 59 out of the 70 seats with the Liberal Democrats forming the primary opposition with six of the remaining seats, a role the party takes from the Conservative Party who were elected to the council with five seats, three fewer than they won in 2018.

Background

History 

The thirty-two London boroughs were established in 1965 by the London Government Act 1963. They are the principal authorities in Greater London and have responsibilities including education, housing, planning, highways, social services, libraries, recreation, waste, environmental health and revenue collection. Some of the powers are shared with the Greater London Authority, which also manages passenger transport, police and fire.

Since its formation, Ealing has been under either Labour control or Conservative control. Labour, Conservative, Liberal Democrat and independent and residents association councillors have been elected to the council. The council has had an overall Labour majority since the 2010 election, in which Labour won forty seats, the Conservatives won twenty-four and the Liberal Democrats won five. In the most recent election in 2018, Labour won 57 seats, the Conservatives won eight and the Liberal Democrats won four. The incumbent leader of the council is the Labour councillor Peter Mason, who has held that position since May 2021.

Council term 
In October 2018, a Labour councillor for Dormers Wells, Tej Ram Bagha, died. He had served on the council for twenty-four years, including as mayor in 2014. In the 8 November 2018 by-election to replace him, the Labour candidate Mohinda Kaur Midha was elected. Two Conservative councillors in the borough were elected as Members of Parliament in the 2019 general election. Alexander Stafford was elected as MP for Rother Valley and Joy Morrissey became MP for Beaconsfield. The Labour leader of Ealing council called for both to resign as councillors as their new roles wouldn't leave them enough time to fulfil their duties as councillors. Morrissey announced her resignation on 11 February 2020. Stafford resigned in March. By-elections for both seats were due to be held in May 2020 alongside the London mayoral election and London Assembly election, but both the council by-elections and London-wide elections were delayed by a year due to the COVID-19 pandemic. In July 2020, Anna Tomlinson, a Labour councillor for Hobbayne ward, died. By-elections for all three seats were held on 6 May 2021 alongside the 2021 London mayoral election and London Assembly election. Each seat was held by the party of its previous incumbent: Stafford's seat of Ealing Broadway was won by the Conservative candidate Julian Gallant, Morrissey's seat of Hanger Hill was won by the Conservative candidate Fabio Conti and Tomlinson's seat of Hobbayne was won by the Labour candidate Louise Brett. In May 2021, Peter Mason was chosen by the Labour group as the new leader of the council. Lewis Cox, a Labour councillor for Hobbayne ward, resigned, calling Ealing Labour "toxic". The by-election to replace him was held on 16 September 2021, and was won by the Labour candidate Claire Tighe. Tighe was working as a Labour Party official. The Labour councillor Tejinder Dhami died in December 2021 after 19 years on the council. As this was less than six months from the election, no by-election was held.

Along with most other London boroughs, Ealing was subject to a boundary review ahead of the 2022 election. The Local Government Boundary Commission for England concluded that the council should have 70 seats, an increase of one, and produced new election boundaries following a period of consultation. The new scheme consists of twenty-two three-councillor wards and two two-councillor wards.

Electoral process 
Ealing, like other London borough councils, elects all of its councillors at once every four years. The previous election took place in 2018. The election took place by multi-member first-past-the-post voting, with each ward being represented by two or three councillors. Electors had as many votes as there are councillors to be elected in their ward, with the top two or three being elected.

All registered electors (British, Irish, Commonwealth and European Union citizens) living in London aged 18 or over were entitled to vote in the election. People who lived at two addresses in different councils, such as university students with different term-time and holiday addresses, were entitled to be registered for and vote in elections in both local authorities. Voting in-person at polling stations took place from 7:00 to 22:00 on election day, and voters were able to apply for postal votes or proxy votes in advance of the election.

Council composition

Results summary

Ward Results 

EIN = Ealing Independent Network

Statements of persons nominated were published on 6 April. The count took place between 5th May 2022 and 6th May 2022.

Central Greenford

Dormers Wells

Ealing Broadway

Ealing Common

East Acton

Greenford Broadway

Hanger Hill

Hanwell Broadway

Lady Margaret

North Acton

North Greenford

North Hanwell

Northfield

Northolt Mandeville

Northolt West End

Norwood Green

Perivale

Pitshanger

South Acton

Southall Broadway

Southall Green

Southall West

Southfield

Walpole

References 

Council elections in the London Borough of Ealing
Ealing